Babu China is a town and Union Council, located in the Killa Saifullah District of Balochistan state in Pakistan. It lies close to the southernmost Pakistani border with Afghanistan.

References

Populated places in Killa Saifullah District